Ronald Federico Araújo da Silva (born 7 March 1999) is a Uruguayan professional footballer who plays as a centre-back for La Liga club Barcelona and the Uruguay national team.  Considered to be one of the best defenders in the world, he is known for his strength, speed and athleticism.

Club career

Rentistas
Born to a Uruguayan father and a Brazilian mother in Rivera, a city near the Brazil border, Araújo joined Rentistas from hometown club Huracán de Rivera. He made his senior debut with the former on 24 September 2016, coming on as a late substitute in a 1–0 Segunda División away win against Tacuarembó.

Araújo scored his first senior goal on 9 December 2016, netting the equaliser in a 2–2 home draw against Central Español. He became a regular starter during the 2017 season, and scored a hat-trick in a 3–2 away win over Villa Española on 17 June of that year.

It was at Rentistas that Araújo made the significant switch in position from forward to defender.

Boston River
On 28 July 2017, Araújo joined Primera División side Boston River. He made his debut in the category on 18 September, replacing Maximiliano Sigales late into a 1–0 home success over El Tanque Sisley.

Barcelona
On 29 August 2018, Araújo signed a five-year contract with FC Barcelona for a fee of €1.7 million, plus €3.5 million in variables; he was initially assigned to the reserves in Segunda División B. He made his first team – and La Liga – debut on 6 October of the following year, coming off the bench to replace Jean-Clair Todibo in the 73rd minute of a 4–0 home win against Sevilla; however, he was sent off in the 86th minute for tackling Javier Hernández.

For the 2020–21 season, Araújo was promoted to the main squad, being handed the number 4 jersey, which was previously worn by Ivan Rakitić. On 19 December 2020, he scored his first La Liga goal for Barcelona in a 2–2 home draw against Valencia.

On 20 March 2022, Araújo scored his first goal in El Clásico, heading in a corner from Ousmane Dembélé in a 4–0 away victory against the league leaders at Santiago Bernabéu.

For the first 21 league games of the 2022–23 season, Araújo formed a defensive partnership alongside Andreas Christensen and occasionally Jules Koundé at centre-back, helping Barcelona keep the most clean sheets (16) in all of Europe’s top 5 leagues.

International career
After representing Uruguay at under-18 and under-20 levels, Araújo received his first call up for the senior side on 5 October 2020, for two 2022 FIFA World Cup qualifiers against Chile and Ecuador. He made his full international debut eight days later, starting in a 2–4 loss against the latter.

In June 2021, Araújo was included in the final 26-man Uruguay squad for the 2021 Copa América in Brazil, but he didn't feature in any of Uruguay's five games in the tournament while also suffering a muscle injury.

Despite nursing an injury, Araújo was included in the Uruguay squad for the 2022 FIFA World Cup, having expected recovery during knockout phase. He didn't make an appearance as Uruguay were eliminated in the group stage.

Career statistics

Club

International

Honours
Barcelona
Copa del Rey: 2020–21
Supercopa de España: 2022–23

Uruguay U20
 South American Games silver medal: 2018

Individual
 La Liga Team of the Season: 2021–22

References

External links

Profile at the FC Barcelona website

1999 births
Living people
People from Rivera Department
Uruguayan footballers
Association football defenders
C.A. Rentistas players
Boston River players
FC Barcelona Atlètic players
Uruguayan Primera División players
Uruguayan Segunda División players
Uruguay youth international footballers
Uruguay under-20 international footballers
Uruguay international footballers
2021 Copa América players
2022 FIFA World Cup players
South American Games silver medalists for Uruguay
South American Games medalists in football
Uruguayan expatriate footballers
Expatriate footballers in Spain
Uruguayan expatriate sportspeople in Spain
Uruguayan people of Brazilian descent